New Advent is a website that provides online versions of various works connected with the Catholic Church.

History 
New Advent was founded by Kevin Knight, a Catholic layman. In 1993, Knight, then a 26-year-old resident of Denver, Colorado, was inspired, during the visit of Pope John Paul II to that city for World Youth Day, to launch a project to publish the 1913 edition of the 1907–1912 Catholic Encyclopedia on the Internet. Knight founded the non-profit website New Advent to house the undertaking. Volunteers from the United States, Canada, France and Brazil helped in the transcription of the original material. The site went online in 1995 and transcription efforts for Catholic Encyclopedia finished in 1997.

Contents 

New Advent contains several public domain documents relevant to Catholics, including the Catholic Encyclopedia, the Summa Theologica, translated writings of the Church Fathers, a variety of papal encyclicals, and aggregated news relating to the Catholic Church. 

The website provides navigation between related document through the frequent use of hyperlinks to other works hosted on its website.

Reception 
Writing in Reference Reviews, Georgia State University librarian Brian K. Koy labels the website as "highly recommended". Koy describes the website's content as straightforward and as being faithful to the text of the original works hosted on the website, but laments the relative lack of images and what he considers the overuse of hyperlinks.

See also 
 Christian Classics Ethereal Library
 Internet Sacred Text Archive
 List of digital library projects
 Wikisource

References

External links
 

1993 establishments in the United States
American digital libraries
Discipline-oriented digital libraries
Internet properties established in 1993
Libraries established in 1993
Publications of patristic texts
Catholic websites